Saken is a Kazakh masculine given name. Notable people with the name include:

Saken Seifullin (1894–1939), Kazakh poet, writer, and activist
Saken Zhasuzakov (born 1957), Kazakh General and politician

Kazakh masculine given names